is a Japanese video game writer. He is best known for writing several installments of Square Enix's Final Fantasy franchise—namely Final Fantasy VII and its spin-offs Advent Children and Crisis Core, Final Fantasy VIII, and Final Fantasy X and X-2—in addition to the Kingdom Hearts series, the Glory of Heracles series, and the story to the Subspace Emissary mode in Super Smash Bros. Brawl. Nojima also wrote the original lyrics of "Liberi Fatali" for Final Fantasy VIII and both "Suteki da Ne" and the "Hymn of the Fayth" for Final Fantasy X. He is also the founder of Stellavista Ltd.

Biography
Kazushige Nojima first joined Japanese video game developer and publisher Data East.

Square Co.
He joined Square in 1994. He began work on Final Fantasy VII after the main character settings were done, though Nojima considered this early in the process; he was still working on Bahamut Lagoon.

Nojima also wrote the mythology of Fabula Nova Crystallis, which has been used as the story foundation for all the titles within the series. Nojima also wrote most of the Kingdom Hearts games. He also wrote the scenario for Final Fantasy XV (Previously known as Versus XIII).

Freelance
Kazushige Nojima left Square Enix in 2003 and founded Stellavista Ltd, a freelance scenario company. He wrote the story for Sakura Note. He also contributed some story concepts to the script of Final Fantasy XIII. While developing the scenario for Glory of Heracles, Nojima took inspiration from the Fall of Troy and the Battle of Thermopylae. Not many actual Greek locations were used, but locations derived from Greek mythology were.

In 2011 Enterbrain announced on its Famitsu resource that a short anime and audio drama, based on a novel written by Kazushige Nojima, will be streamed with a name Busō Chūgakusei Basket Army (Armed Middle School Student Basket Army).

Writing style and reception
Nojima has been called one of the "strongest voices" in the video game industry for his writing. His stories have been noted for their complexity and fearlessness in delving into romantic plot lines.

Works

Video Games
 Tantei Jingūji Saburō: Kiken na Futari (1988–1989; as Scenario Writer)
 Heracles no Eikō II: Titan no Metsubō (1989; as Scenario Writer)
 Tantei Jingūji Saburō: Toki no Sugiyuku mamani... (1991; as Scenario Writer)
 Heracles no Eikō III: Kamigami no Chinmoku (1992; as Scenario Writer)
 Heracles no Eikō IV: Kamigami kara no Okurimono (1994; as Scenario Writer and Director (with Eiichi Nishiyama))
 Bahamut Lagoon (1996; as Director)
 Final Fantasy VII (1997; as Scenario Writer) (with Yoshinori Kitase)
 Final Fantasy VIII (1999; as Scenario Writer)
 Final Fantasy X (2001; as Scenario Writer) (with Daisuke Watanabe, Motomu Toriyama and Yoshinori Kitase)
 Kingdom Hearts (2002; as Scenario Writer) (with Jun Akiyama and Daisuke Watanabe)
 Final Fantasy X-2 (2003; as Scenario Writer) (with Daisuke Watanabe)
 Before Crisis: Final Fantasy VII (2004; as Scenario Supervisor)
 Kingdom Hearts: Chain of Memories (2004; as Scenario Supervisor)
 Kingdom Hearts II (2005; as Scenario Writer)
 Crisis Core: Final Fantasy VII (2007; as Scenario Writer) (with Sachie Hirano)
 Super Smash Bros. Brawl (2008; as Scenario Writer for Adventure Mode: The Subspace Emissary) (with Masahiro Sakurai)
 Glory of Heracles (2008; as Scenario Writer)
 Sakura Note (2009; as Scenario Writer)
 Final Fantasy XIII (2009; as Scenario Concept)
 Last Ranker (2010; as Scenario Writer)
 Lord of Arcana (2010; as Original Lyrics)
 Black Rock Shooter: The Game (2011; as Scenario Writer)
 Sol Trigger (2012; as Scenario Writer)
 Final Fantasy X/X-2 HD Remaster (2013, Scenario Writer, Audio Drama Writer)
 Zodiac (2015; as Scenario Writer)
 Mobius Final Fantasy (2015-2020; as Scenario Writer)
 Dragon's Dogma Online (2015; as Scenario Writer)
 Final Fantasy XV (2016; as Original Story Plot)
 Itadaki Street: Dragon Quest and Final Fantasy 30th Anniversary (2017; as Scenario Supervisor)
 Dissidia Final Fantasy NT (2018; as Scenario Concept)
 Final Fantasy XV: Pocket Edition (2018; as Original Story Plot)
 Kingdom Hearts III (2019; as Scenario Supervisor)
 Final Fantasy VII Remake (2020; as Story and Scenario Writer. Lyrics for Main Theme.)
 Astria Ascending (2021; as Scenario Writer)
 Final Fantasy VII: First Soldier (2021; as Scenario Supervisor)
 Stranger of Paradise: Final Fantasy Origin (2022; as Scenario and Story)
 Crisis Core: Final Fantasy VII Reunion (2022; as Scenario Writer)
 Final Fantasy VII: Ever Crisis (TBA; as Scenario Writer)
 Final Fantasy VII Rebirth (TBA; as Scenario Writer)

Novels
 Final Fantasy VII: On the Way to a Smile (2005-2009; as Writer)
 Final Fantasy VII The Kids Are Alright: A Turks Side Story (2011; as Writer)
 Final Fantasy X-2.5 ~Eien no Daishō~ (2013; as Writer)
 Basket Army (2013; as Writer)
 Final Fantasy VII Remake: Trace of Two Pasts (2021; as Writer)

Film
 Final Fantasy VII Advent Children (2005; as Scenario Writer)

Anime
 Last Order Final Fantasy VII (2005; as Story)
 Lupin the 3rd Part V (2018; as Screenplay for episode 12)

References

External links
 

1964 births
Living people
Square (video game company)
Square Enix people
People from Sapporo
Video game writers